Patricia Lavail (born 1962) is a French recorder player.

Biography and career 
Born in 1962, Patricia Lavail graduated from the Conservatoire de Strasbourg where she studied with Alain Sobczak. In 1987, she was the first French laureate of the Early Music International Competition of the MAfestival Brugge in the instrumental solo category.

She began teaching the recorder at the Conservatory of Saint-Cloud in her late teens, before directing the early music department.

As an instrumentalist, she collaborated with ensembles such as Capriccio Stravagante, Suonare Cantare, Opera Fuoco and Sesquitercia, exploring a repertoire from the Middle Ages to Baroque. She also has numerous contemporary world premieres to her credit, performing and recording for the first time works of Konstantin Miereanu, Daniel Tosi, Akira Tamba.

She is a founding member of Fuoco E Cenere with Jay Bernfeld and has appeared in every season of the ensemble since its creation

Discography

With Fuoco E Cenere 
 Fantasy in Blue, Purcell & Gershwin (2001)
 Boismortier – Suites, Sonatas & Concerto for Viola da Gamba (2002)
 Gentil Mia Donna – Petrarca e la musica (2004)
 Canta Napoli (2006)
 La Dafne – Marco da Gagliano (2008)
 Umana E Inumana – Alessandro Scarlatti, Francesco Durante (2010)
 Judith & Esther (2014)

With Suonare e Cantare 
 Charpentier : Trois leçons de ténèbres pour basse-taille (1998)
 Madrigali e Altre Musiche Concertate, Tarquinio Merula (2000)

With Capriccio Stravagante 
 Monteverdi e il suo Tempo (1991)
 Venezia Stravagantissima (2002)

With Opera Fuoco 
 Jephtha, Haendel (2007)

References

External links 
 Fuoco E Cenere website
 Radio show with Patricia Lavail
 Press review of a concert on November 2016 at the Miami Tropical Baroque Festival by Laurence Budmen in the South Florida Classical Review

Living people
1962 births
French recorder players
French classical flautists